Tezos is an open-source blockchain that can execute peer-to-peer transactions and serve as a platform for deploying smart contracts. The native cryptocurrency for the Tezos blockchain is the tez (ISO 4217: XTZ; sign: ꜩ). The Tezos network achieves consensus using proof-of-stake. Tezos uses an on-chain governance model that enables the protocol to be amended when upgrade proposals receive a favorable vote from the community. Its testnet was launched in June 2018, and its mainnet went live in September 2018.

History 
Tezos, first proposed in 2014, was created by husband-and-wife team Arthur and Kathleen Breitman. While working at Morgan Stanley in 2014, Arthur Breitman released two papers proposing a new type of blockchain under the pseudonym "L. M Goodman", referencing a journalist at Newsweek who had misidentified the creator of Bitcoin. He chose the name "Tezos" after writing a program to list unclaimed websites that could be pronounced in English. In 2015, with the goal of developing Tezos, Arthur Breitman registered a company called Dynamic Ledger Solutions Inc (DLS) in Delaware, with himself as chief executive. He contracted French firm OCamlPro to help develop the software. Arthur worked at Morgan Stanley at the time, but he did not provide them with notice of his work on Tezos as required by the Financial Industry Regulatory Authority (FINRA), and he was eventually fined $20,000. He sought to raise $5 to $10 million from banks but was unable to find backers. By 2016, he left Morgan Stanley; Tezos received $612,000 from 10 backers while the Breitmans planned for an initial coin offering (ICO).

They received a $1.5 million investment from Tim Draper and hired public relations firm Strange Brew to promote their project. The firm was alleged to have falsely claimed that large American financial firms were using Tezos.

Tezos Foundation and initial coin offering 
In 2011, Arthur Breitman first met South African cryptocurrency entrepreneur Johann Gevers through his friend Patri Friedman, the founder of The Seasteading Institute, who had hired Gevers for a project which Breitman had followed closely. In 2016, the Tezos Foundation was established in Zug Switzerland by Arthur and Kathleen Breitman, Swiss law firm MME and Gevers, to support an initial coin offering (ICO) for the Tezos platform. They planned for the foundation to become a non-profit that would raise money through the ICO and acquire DLS, which owned the group's technology.

In addition to Switzerland's relatively lax financial oversight and effectively zero corporate tax rate, the benefits for Tezos of being in a foundation under the Swiss Civil Code included the ability to treat fundraising transactions as donations, and acting as an additional layer of institutional security to protect donations. Gevers became the foundation's first president.

On July 1, 2017, the Tezos Foundation raised $232 million in Bitcoin and Ethereum in one of the biggest initial coin offerings (ICOs) at the time. The contributions were termed "non-refundable donations", which Kathleen Breitman likened to a pledge drive where people would receive tote bags, though some participants considered them to be an investment. If considered an investment rather than a donation, it would fall under the purview of the Securities and Exchange Commission (SEC). After the ICO, it was planned that the Tezos Foundation would pay to acquire DLS, and if the Tezos blockchain functioned for at least three months, the Breitmans would receive 8.5% of the ICO and 10% of the tokens.

By October, the Breitmans and Gevers were in a dispute over control of the project, with the Breitmans alleging Gevers pressured the foundation council into signing a contract giving him a bonus of $1.5 million.  Gevers controlled the assets held by the foundation which stood at $820 million by December, including the Breitmans' share. The disagreements led to delays in the deployment of Tezos, which caused investors to bring lawsuits alleging fraud during the fundraiser and unauthorized sales of securities.  

In 2018, Gevers resigned and received $400,000, and the foundation board was replaced; Tezos went live that September.

In 2020, the Tezos founders settled the lawsuits, with the Tezos Foundation paying $25 million, before federal courts ruled on whether the ICO was a sale of unregistered securities. Arthur Breitman joined the foundation's council in 2021.

In October 2021, Tezos became a sponsor of the New York Mets.

In February 2022, Tezos sponsored the Manchester United football club. The multi-year deal was reportedly worth over £20 million per year. In November 2022, Manchester United issued NFT digital collectibles on the Tezos blockchain.

Design 
The primary protocol of Tezos utilizes liquid proof of stake (LPoS) and supports Turing-complete smart contracts in a domain-specific language called Michelson. Michelson is a purely functional stack-based language with a reduced instruction set and no side effects, designed with formal verification in mind.

The Tezos protocol allows itself to be amended by a staged process performed by committing operations to the stored blockchain to submit proposals (intended code changes) and to vote on those changes. If a proposal receives enough votes the protocol updates itself to incorporate the code changes.

The Tezos blockchain has been used for NFTs as an alternative to more energy-intensive projects such as Ethereum.

Founders
Tezos co-founder Arthur Breitman studied applied mathematics, computer science, and physics in France and financial mathematics at New York University under Nassim Nicholas Taleb before working in quantitative finance. Kathleen Breitman (née McCaffrey) studied at Cornell University and worked at a hedge fund and as a consultant. Arthur was the leader of an anarcho-capitalist group in New York, and Kathleen was a libertarian Republican; the two of them met at a crypto-anarchist lunch in 2010 and married in 2013.

References

Sources

External links 
 
 Tezos Foundation website
 Tezos Commons website

Cryptocurrencies
Blockchains
Currencies introduced in 2018
2018 establishments
Cryptocurrency projects